is a Japanese video game developer and publisher founded on October 5, 1980. In 2016, it was renamed Culture Brain Excel.

History 
Culture Brain was founded in 1980 as Nihon Game Corporation. In 1981, a subsidiary to handle the sales operations of the company was established. Its first video games were arcades games, with titles such as Shanghai Kid and Chinese Hero that were manufactured under "Taiyo Systems" trademark. In 1987, it transitioned from arcade to console video games and renamed itself "Culture Brain". The company has also alternatively used the brand "Micro Academy" in the mid-1980s.

In North America, Culture Brain is mostly known for its six video games for the Nintendo Entertainment System and its three for the Super NES. Three of those NES games, Baseball Simulator 1.000, The Magic of Scheherazade and Flying Warriors, were strongly redesigned from their Japanese source to better appeal North American consumers.

Culture Brain was distinct for its innovative gameplay by incorporating multiple genres in its games. However, like many other Japanese video game companies, Culture Brain ceased its operations in the United States in the 1990s. Ever since the demise of Culture Brain USA, video games developed by the parent company have rarely made it in America. An exception of the latter situation is the Nintendo 64 version of Flying Dragon which was published by Natsume.

Culture Brain also ran until 2003 a professional school, the Culture Brain Art Institute.

In 2016, the company was renamed Culture Brain Excel and the website's URL was changed to the new name. The longtime Culture Brain logo was instantly dropped and will be replaced by a new logo that is scheduled to be unveiled in 2017.

Games

Nintama Rantarō series

Baseball Simulator series
These Baseball titles included some form of "Super League" where pitchers and batters would have special abilities.

 Baseball Simulator 1.000 (1989, NES), also known as Choujin Ultra Baseball
 Super Baseball Simulator 1.000 (1991, Super NES), also known as Super Ultra Baseball
 Ultra Baseball Jitsumeiban (1992, SNES) NPB licensed.
 Super Ultra Baseball 2 (1994, SNES)
 Ultra Baseball Jitsumeiban 2 (1994, SNES) NPB licensed.
 Ultra Baseball Jitsumeiban 3 (1995, SNES) NPB licensed.
 Pro Yakyū Star (1997, SNES) NPB licensed.

Hiryū no Ken series

 Shanghai Kid (known in Japan as Hokuha Syourin Hiryu no Ken (Arcade)
 Hiryu no Ken Special: Fighting Wars (NES - Japan only)
 Flying Dragon: The Secret Scroll (NES)
 Flying Warriors (NES)
 Fighting Simulator 2-in-1: Flying Warriors (Game Boy)
 Ultimate Fighter (Super NES)
 SD Hiryu no Ken Gaiden (Game Boy)
 Flying Dragon (Nintendo 64)
 SD Hiryu no Ken Densetsu (Nintendo 64 - Japan only)
 Hiryu no Ken Retsuden GB (Game Boy Color)
 Virtual Hiryu No Ken (Sony PlayStation)

Super Chinese series

In this list are series which were originally released as "Chinese Hero", but became better known as Super Chinese, but with the exception of "Kung-Fu Heroes", these titles were released in North America as the "Ninja Brothers" series.

 Chinese Hero (Arcade)
 Kung Fu Heroes (NES)
 Little Ninja Brothers (NES)
 Ninja Boy (Game Boy)
 Super Chinese 3 (NES)
 Super Ninja Boy (Super NES)
 Ninja Boy 2 (Game Boy)
 Super Chinese World 2 (Super NES)
 Super Chinese Fighter (Super NES)
 Super Chinese Land 3 (Game Boy)
 Super Chinese World 3 (Super NES)
 Super Chinese Land 1-2-3 Dash (Game Boy)
 Super Chinese Fighter GB (Game Boy)
 Super Chinese I+II Advance (Game Boy Advance)
 Super Chinese Labyrinth (Game Boy Advance)

Oshare Princess series
A Japan-only series of games for the GBA (with two DS versions) about fashion and dressing up. The games feature a wide range of clothes, shoes, accessories and makeup to be used in different combinations. There are 5 GBA games and 2 DS games.

Ferret/Hamster Monogatari series
A Japan-only series of games formally about care-taking ferrets, and later about care-taking hamsters. The illustrations of the Hamster Monogatari ones were heavily inspired by Ritsuko Kawai's children's storybook series, Hamtaro.

 Ferret Monogatari: Watashi no Okini Iri (Game Boy Color)
 Hamster Monogatari (Sony PlayStation)
 Hamster Monogatari 64 (Nintendo 64)
 Hamster Monogatari 2 GBA (Game Boy Advance)
 Hamster Monogatari GB + Magi Ham Mahou no Shoujo (Game Boy Color)
 Hamster Monogatari 3 GBA (Game Boy Advance)
 Hamster Monogatari Collection (Game Boy Advance)
 Hamster Monogatari 3EX, 4, Special (Game Boy Advance)

Konchuu Monster series
A Japan-only series of games about catching, training and battling insects. First released with Super Chinese Labyrinth both in Volume 3 of Culture Brain's Twin Series, a series of two-in-one Game Boy Advance games.

 Konchuu Monster (Game Boy Advance)
 Konchuu Monster: Battle Master (Game Boy Advance)
 Konchuu Monster: Battle Stadium (Game Boy Advance)
 Konchuu no Mori no Daibouken (Game Boy Advance)

Other
 The Magic of Scheherazade  (NES)
 First Queen (Super NES)
 Osu!! Karate Bu (Super NES)
 Computer Nouryoku Kaiseki: Ultra Baken (Super NES)
 Sweet Cookie Pie (Game Boy Advance)

References

External links
 (current)  
Official website (former) 

Japanese companies established in 1980
Software companies based in Tokyo
Video game companies established in 1980
Video game companies of Japan
Video game publishers
Video game development companies